Dick Dickinson (September 16, 1895 – July 27, 1956) was an American film actor. He appeared in more than 90 films between 1920 and 1954.

Selected filmography

 The Phantom of the West (1931)
 The Galloping Ghost (1931)
 The Lightning Warrior (1931)
 The Fighting Marshal (1931)
 The Fighting Fool (1932)
 Hidden Valley (1932)
 Vanishing Men (1932)
 Texas Cyclone (1932)
 Law of the West (1932)
 High Speed (1932)
 Texas Buddies (1932)
 Galloping Romeo (1933)
 West of the Divide (1934)
 Big Calibre (1935)
 Prairie Justice (1938)
 Lightning Strikes West (1940)
 American Empire (1942)
 House of Frankenstein (1944)
 The Lost Trail (1945)

References

External links

1895 births
1956 deaths
20th-century American male actors
American male film actors
Male actors from Iowa
People from Tipton, Iowa
Male Western (genre) film actors